The women's 500 metres races of the 2013–14 ISU Speed Skating World Cup 4, arranged in Sportforum Hohenschönhausen, in Berlin, Germany, were held on 6 and 7 December 2013.

In race one, Lee Sang-hwa of South Korea extended her suite of victories from the start of the season, while Olga Fatkulina of Russia came second, and Wang Beixing of China came third. Vanessa Bittner of Austria won the Division B race.

Lee didn't skate in race two. In her absence, Fatkulina and Wang both advanced one place on the podium, taking the gold and silver medals, while Heather Richardson of the United States, who was in fourth place in race one, made it to the podium, taking the bronze. Mayon Kuipers of the Netherlands won the second Division B race.

Race 1
Race one took place on Friday, 6 December, with Division B scheduled in the morning session, at 09:50, and Division A scheduled in the afternoon session, at 15:15.

Division A

Division B

Race 2
Race two took place on Saturday, 7 December, with Division B scheduled in the morning session, at 09:00, and Division A scheduled in the afternoon session, at 13:00.

Division A

Division B

References

Women 0500
4